Fahad Saleh Al Enezi (born 1 September 1988) is a Kuwaiti professional footballer who plays as a winger.

Career
Al Enezi obtained permission from the Kazma board for a week-long vacation to travel to Saudi Arabia. However, Al Enezi traveled to Serbia for a trial with Partizan. He played one game for Partizan B in the Serbian Reserves First League, before returning to Kuwait.

In the 2011–12 season Al Enezi joined Al-Ittihad on loan from Kazma. His spell at Al-Ittihad was short and without success due to injuries and financial problems with the club.

Style of play
Al Enezi is a pacy player who tends to cause problems for defending opposition on the left wing with his combination of skill, determination and speed. He is renowned for his trait of running box-to-box and the ability to slot-in dangerous shots and crosses from outside the thirty-yard box. In light of his developing career, Al Enezi has come to be recognized as the 'fastest player in Asia'.

Personal life 
Al Enezi is Bedoon. He obtained Kuwaiti citizenship in 2016 after the Council of Ministers approved his naturalization under the item of great services.

Career statistics

International goals
Scores and results list Kuwait's goal tally first.

Honours

Club
Kazma
Kuwait Emir Cup (1): 2011
Kuwait SC
Kuwaiti Premier League (2): 2012–13, 2014–15
Kuwait Emir Cup (1): 2014
Kuwait Super Cup (1): 2015

International
Kuwait
West Asian Football Federation Championship (1): 2010
Gulf Cup of Nations (1): 2010

References

External links

1988 births
Living people
Sportspeople from Kuwait City
Association football wingers
Kuwaiti footballers
Kuwait international footballers
2011 AFC Asian Cup players
Kazma SC players
Ittihad FC players
Kuwait SC players
Al-Markhiya SC players
Kuwait Premier League players
Saudi Professional League players
Qatari Second Division players
Kuwaiti expatriate footballers
Expatriate footballers in Saudi Arabia
Expatriate footballers in Qatar
Kuwaiti expatriate sportspeople in Saudi Arabia
Kuwaiti expatriate sportspeople in Qatar
AFC Cup winning players
Al-Nasr SC (Kuwait) players